Sašo Lukič (born 24 April 1973) is a retired Slovenian football midfielder.

References

1973 births
Living people
Slovenian footballers
NK Maribor players
NK Olimpija Ljubljana (1945–2005) players
NK Mura players
NK Korotan Prevalje players
FC Gratkorn players
Association football midfielders
Slovenian expatriate footballers
Expatriate footballers in Austria
Slovenian expatriate sportspeople in Austria
Slovenian PrvaLiga players
2. Liga (Austria) players